is a railway station in the city of Yurihonjō, Akita Prefecture,  Japan, operated by JR East.

Lines

Station layout
The station has two opposed side platforms connected by a level crossing. The platforms are short, and can accommodate trains of only three carriages or less. The station is unattended.

Platforms

History
It was elevated to a full station at the time of the privatization of the Japan National Railway (JNR) on April 1, 1987.

Surrounding area

See also
List of railway stations in Japan

External links

 JR East Station information 

Railway stations in Japan opened in 1987
Railway stations in Akita Prefecture
Uetsu Main Line
Yurihonjō